Dangerous Remedy is an Australian historical drama and crime thriller telemovie, which was broadcast on ABC1 on 4 November 2012. It depicts real life Scottish-born doctor, Bertram Wainer (Jeremy Sims) as he strives for abortion law reform in the state of Victoria during the late 1960s and early 1970s. Also appearing are Susie Porter, William McInnes, Maeve Dermody and Mark Leonard Winter. The script was written by Kris Wyld and is loosely based on Wainer's account, It Isn't Nice (1972). Dangerous Remedy was directed by Ken Cameron and produced for the ABC by Ned Lander with filming in Melbourne commencing in March 2012. At the 2nd AACTA Awards, held in January 2013, Porter was nominated for Best Lead Actress in a Television Drama for her role of Peggy Berman.

Plot 

In 1967 Bertram attends a young woman who is haemorrhaging severely after having a "backyard" abortion – she later dies in hospital. By 1969 Bertram is campaigning for abortion law reform and is assisted by Jo and Peggy. Peggy is having an affair with John, who is a physically abusive police inspector. Bertram, Jo and Lionel investigate a police protection racket, with doctors bribing police to "look the other way" by not investigating their illegal abortions. The corrupt police are from the homicide squad with John appointed as their head and his boss, Jack. Bertram and his family are targeted with arson, serious assault and murder attempts. Lionel dies in suspicious circumstances, which police attribute to suicide. John threatens Bertram to drop his crusade, while Arthur ignores Bertram's calls for an independent investigation into police corruption. Despite these setbacks Bertram uses the press to raise public awareness of the corruption and forces the state government into holding an independent inquiry in January 1970. This results in three police officers, including John and Jack, being jailed.

Cast 

Credits:
 Jeremy Sims as Bertram Wainer – general practitioner, campaigns for abortion law reform
 Susie Porter as Peggy Berman – medical clinic receptionist, John's mistress, becomes a women's rights activist
 William McInnes as John Ford – Victorian police detective inspector, becomes head of Homicide department
 Maeve Dermody as Joanne Bertram – women's rights activist, became Bertram's second wife
 Mark Leonard Winter as Lionel Pugh – Australian Broadcasting Corporation investigative journalist, Bertram's public relations officer
 Gary Sweet as Jack Matthews – police detective superintendent, Ford's boss
 Caroline Craig as Barbara Wainer – Bertran's first wife
 Nicholas Bell as Troup – medical doctor, has his patients' files confiscated during a police raid
 Peter O'Brien as Barry Smith – medical doctor, performs abortions, fakes his own death to escape investigation by press and Wainer
 Chris Haywood as Sir Arthur Rylah – state deputy premier, justice minister, refuses to acknowledge Bertran's claims of police corruption

Critical reception 

David Knox of TV Tonight provided a mixed review of Dangerous Remedy. He felt that Sims "carried the weight of almost every scene" and "gives [his role] everything he has." While Porter's "Berman plays a central role in this saga" and Winter provided "an impressive performance." Nevertheless, "whilst it's fair to say some of the shocking dramatics that befall Wainer did take place, here they stray close to adventures befitting a Saturday matinee on the silver screen." Hooplas Lucy Clark found it had a "deep and everlasting value" in that it "highlights complexity in a debate too often characterised by polar extremes, by black and white."

References

External links 

 

Australian television films
Australian biographical films
Cultural depictions of Australian men
Films shot in Australia
2012 drama films
2012 films
2012 television films
2010s English-language films